Mariya Arkadevna Litovskaya, née Yeremeyeva (b. October 25, 1958) is a Soviet and Russian philologist, literary critic, Professor of the Ural Federal University, one of the leading scholars at the Institute of History and Archaeology under the Russian Academy of Sciences (Ural Department). She is a specialist in the fields of the 20th century Russian literature, sociology of literature and education, Ural literature.

Career 
She was born in Sverdlovsk in the teachers' family, graduated from the philological department of the Ural Federal University in 1980. In 1983 she defended her thesis. Starting from that year Litovskaya worked for the University at the Soviet Literature Department.  Her doctoral dissertation Social and artistic phenomenon of Valentin Kataev was defended in 2000. From 1998 to 2007 she headed the History Department of the Institute of History and Archaeology (the Russian Academy of Sciences, Ural Department).

Selected publications 
 C. De Maegd-Soëp. Yury Trifonov and the drama of Russian intelligentsia, 1997 (translation)
 The phoenix sings before the sun. Valentin Kataev's phenomenon, 1999
 The gender relations and gender policy at higher education institution: a collection of articles, 2003
 Bazhov encyclopaedia, 2007

References 

1958 births
Academic staff of Ural Federal University
Soviet philologists
20th-century philologists
Russian philologists
Women philologists
Women linguists
Russian literary historians
Russian women historians
Russian literary critics
Women literary critics
Soviet literary historians
Pavel Bazhov Prize recipients
Living people
Women literary historians